The 2019 Oeste Ladies Open was a professional tennis tournament played on outdoor hard courts. It was the first edition of the tournament which was part of the 2019 ITF Women's World Tennis Tour. It took place in Caldas da Rainha, Portugal between 23 and 29 September 2019.

Singles main-draw entrants

Seeds

 1 Rankings are as of 16 September 2019.

Other entrants
The following players received wildcards into the singles main draw:
  Maria Inês Fonte
  Francisca Jorge
  Inês Murta
  Laura Pigossi

The following players received entry from the qualifying draw:
  Ainhoa Atucha Gómez
  Victoria Bosio
  Sarah Beth Grey
  Karin Kennel
  Verena Meliss
  Laetitia Pulchartová
  Ekaterina Shalimova
  Eden Silva

The following player received entry as a lucky loser:
  Olga Parres Azcoitia

Champions

Singles

 Isabella Shinikova def.  Natalija Kostić, 6–3, 2–0, ret.

Doubles

 Jessika Ponchet /  Isabella Shinikova def.  Anna Danilina /  Vivian Heisen, 6–1, 6–3

References

External links
 2019 Oeste Ladies Open at ITFtennis.com

2019 ITF Women's World Tennis Tour
2019 in Portuguese tennis
September 2019 sports events in Portugal